The  is an archaeological site with traces of a late Yayoi to Kofun period settlement in the town of Harima, Hyōgo Prefecture, in the Kansai region of Japan. The site was designated a National Historic Site in 1967.

Overview
The Ōnaka site is located at the southern end of the Inamino plateau at an elevation of about 15 meters, and extends for about 300 meters from east-to-west and about 150 meters from north-to-south. The ruins are at the tip of a diluvial highland which gently slopes from east-to-west, and two kilometers from the present-day coast line of the Seto Inland Sea. The site was discovered on June 24, 1962 by three students from Harima Junior High School who were interested in archaeology and who had heard that a large quantity of earthenware shards had been unearthed during the construction of a nearby railway line in 1923. Exploring the area, they discovered shards of earthenware, ironware, whetstones, shells, octopus jars, and other artifacts. A local teacher identified the earthenware as Yayoi pottery and a report was filed with the Harima Town Board of Education. The first archaeological excavation was conducted in December 1962, with twenty more excavations conducted annually through 2003.  Along with many more artifacts, the foundations of numerous pit dwellings, with various layouts, such as circular, square, and polygonal were discovered. Of especial note was a fragment of a Chinese-made bronze mirror. 

Since 1974, a number of reconstructions of pit dwellings have has been built and the site opened to the public as the Prefectural Historic Site Park Onaka Archaeological Park (nicknamed "Harima Onaka Ancient Village"). On October 13, 2007, the  located on adjacent land and incorporated into the park. The site is a 15-minute walk from Tsuchiyama Station on the JR West Sanyo Main Line.

Gallery

See also
List of Historic Sites of Japan (Hyōgo)

References

External links

 Harima Town home page 

Yayoi period
Archaeological sites in Japan
History of Hyōgo Prefecture
Harima, Hyōgo
Historic Sites of Japan